Rancho Lomerias Muertas was a  Mexican land grant in present-day San Benito County, California given in 1842 by Governor Juan B. Alvarado to José Antonio Castro.  The name means "barren hills".  The grant was between the Pajaro River and the San Benito River, south of present-day Gilroy.

History
General José Castro was the son of José Tiburcio Castro, administrator of the secularized Mission San Juan Bautista, and grantee of Rancho Sausal.

In 1844, José Antonio Castro sold Rancho Lomerias Muertas to José María Sanchez. Sanchez was the grantee in 1835 of Rancho Llano de Tesquisquita directly to the north of  Rancho Lomerias Muertas.  Jose Maria Sanchez (1804–1852), came to California from Mexico in 1825 forming a partnership with Francisco Perez Pacheco, grantee of Rancho Ausaymas y San Felipe.  In 1840, Sanchez married Encarnacion Ortega (1824–1894), the daughter of Quentin Ortega and Vicenta Butron of Rancho San Ysidro.  The first rancho Sanchez bought  was Rancho Las Animas from the widow of Mariano Castro in 1835.

With the cession of California to the United States following the Mexican-American War, the 1848 Treaty of Guadalupe Hidalgo provided that the land grants would be honored.  As required by the Land Act of 1851, a claim for Rancho Lomerias Muertas was filed with the Public Land Commission in 1852, and the grant was patented to José M. Sanchez in 1866. 

Sanchez drowned in the Pajaro River on Christmas Eve, 1852, leaving his widow, Maria Encarnacion Ortega Sanchez, and five children (sisters: Vicenta; Refugia; Candelaria; Guadalupe and one brother, José Gregorio). Numerous people were interested in gaining control of the vast Sanchez estate. In 1853, Maria Encarnacion Ortega Sanchez married her attorney, Thomas B. Godden. Godden was killed in the explosion of the steamboat "Jenny Lind" en route from Alviso to San Francisco on April 11, 1853. Maria Encarnacion Ortega's two husbands had died within four months of each other. In 1853, Maria Encarnacion Ortega married Dr. Henry L. Sanford. Sanford was killed in 1855, and Maria Encarnacion Ortega married George W. Crane (1827–1868), who died of Measles in 1868.

In 1864, the Sanchez heirs started selling their share of the land to Henry Miller.  By 1867, Miller and Lux owned  of the Sanchez ranchos.

In 1871, and Maria Encarnacion Ortega married her fifth husband, Anastacio Alviso, who was shot and killed shortly after their marriage.

See also
Ranchos of California
List of Ranchos of California

References

Lomerias Muertas
Lomerias Muertas